Qarah Gol-e Sharqi (also Romanized as Qarah Gol-e Sharqī; also known as Qarah Gol and Qareh Gol) is a village in Maraveh Tappeh Rural District, in the Central District of Maraveh Tappeh County, Golestan Province, Iran. At the 2006 census, its population was 692, in 120 families.

References 

Populated places in Maraveh Tappeh County